Wodecki (feminine: Wodecka) is a Polish surname. Notable people with the surname include:

 Marcin Wodecki (born 1988), Polish footballer
 Zbigniew Wodecki (1950–2017), Polish singer-songwriter

See also
 Wadecki

Polish-language surnames